The Sumpter Valley Railway, or Sumpter Valley Railroad, is a  narrow gauge heritage railroad located in Baker County, in the U.S. state of Oregon. Built on a right-of-way used by the original railway of the same name, it carries excursion trains on a roughly  route between McEwen and Sumpter. The railroad has two steam locomotives and several other pieces of rolling stock. Passenger excursion trains operate on weekends and holidays from Memorial Day through the end of September.

History 

The railway was incorporated in 1890 by David Eccles. The  narrow gauge railway's purpose was to haul logs to the Oregon Lumber Company sawmill in South Baker City. The sawmill and railroad remained separate corporations of the same owners for the life of the railroad. The builders of the railway also owned the Grande Ronde Lumber Company in Perry, Oregon, and the railway was financed by Mormons in Utah. The line was built over terrain originally considered as part of a railway from Denver, Colorado to the Pacific coast; but the Union Pacific Railroad opted for a different route to avoid bypassing growing communities which might provide an attractive opportunity for competition by the rapidly growing Oregon Railroad and Navigation Company.

Much of the original equipment came from the Utah & Northern Railway in Idaho and Montana.  The Union Pacific owned the line and began converting it to standard gauge around 1887.  Eccles owned a significant amount of Union Pacific stock, exerting enough influence to acquire the now-unneeded narrow gauge equipment.  The first locomotive to arrive was a small  numbered 285; the Sumpter Valley also purchased a number of the U&N's Brooks  locomotives, along with a large number of boxcars and flatcars. In 1906, the railroad also acquired four locomotives from the Tonopah Railway (later the Tonopah & Goldfield Railroad).

To reach uncut forests further west, the company extended the line in stages. It reached Sumpter in 1896 and continued southwestward to Whitney, Tipton, Austin and Bates. By 1910, it arrived in Prairie City, a ranching and mining community along the John Day River in Grant County. The railroad continued to use wood fuel for their locomotives until converting to oil fuel in June, 1940. Diamond-shaped smokestacks were replaced by cabbage-shaped Rushton stacks after 1916.

Scheduled passenger service on the remaining line ended in 1937. Freight service remained, however, and in 1939 the railway purchased two  Mallet locomotives from the Uintah Railway in Colorado. These engines were converted from coal to oil burners and given tenders from two  locomotives. As traffic declined, the railway sold off the other, unneeded locomotives. This last section was abandoned and removed in 1961.

Heritage operation 
In 1971, a group of volunteers set out to rebuild the Sumpter Valley Railway. The Sumpter Valley Railroad Restoration Inc. was created and 6 miles of track were reinstalled by hand over the next 15 years, to connect the McEwen, Oregon station with Sumpter, Oregon. SVR No. 19, a  steam locomotive built in 1920, was restored to operating condition in 1996. Sister locomotive 20 is also located at the railroad. In 2018, #720 was added to the railroad operating fleet after an overhaul. It previously was used by the Chiquita Banana company.

In 2007, the railway opened its reproduction of the original Sumpter Depot, within sight of the Sumpter Valley Dredge State Heritage Area operated by the Oregon Parks and Recreation Department. The railway operates a number of historic Sumpter Valley Railroad and adjoining  narrow gauge logging railroad steam locomotives and equipment on the line every summer.

In Prairie City at the western end of the original line, the Sumpter Valley Depot Restoration Committee renovated the Sumpter Valley Railway Passenger Station in the 1970s. The City of Prairie City has used it to house the DeWitt Museum since 1984. Its collections include lanterns, lights, and other railway artifacts, and photographs of train wrecks and of life along the rail line.

Gallery

Locomotives

See also 

List of heritage railroads in the United States
List of defunct Oregon railroads

References

External links 

Official website
Sumpter Valley Railway from Abandoned and Active Historical Railroads of the Pacific Northwest

3 ft gauge railways in the United States
Heritage railroads in Oregon
Narrow gauge railroads in Oregon
Defunct Oregon railroads
Transportation in Baker County, Oregon
National Register of Historic Places in Grant County, Oregon
National Register of Historic Places in Baker County, Oregon
1890 establishments in Oregon
Tourist attractions in Baker County, Oregon
Historic districts on the National Register of Historic Places in Oregon
Railway lines on the National Register of Historic Places
Rail infrastructure on the National Register of Historic Places in Oregon